Robert Thomas Hines, Jr. (born January 11, 1975) is an American fighter pilot and NASA astronaut.

Early life and education
Robert "Farmer" Hines was born on January 11, 1975, in Fayetteville, North Carolina to Lynne and Robert Hines Sr. His family moved to Mountain Top, Pennsylvania, where he attended Crestwood High School. In 1989 he attended Space Camp aged 14. He graduated from Boston University in 1997 with a Bachelor of Science degree in aerospace engineering.

Military career
In 1999, Hines graduated from Air Force Officer Training School and was commissioned as a second lieutenant.  He attended Undergraduate Pilot Training at Columbus Air Force Base.  After pilot training, he was an instructor pilot on the T-37 Tweet.  He then trained to be an F-15E Strike Eagle pilot at Seymour Johnson Air Force Base, before an assignment at RAF Lakenheath. While at RAF Lakenheath, he deployed for operations in the Middle East.  In 2008, Hines attended the U.S. Air Force Test Pilot School, where he received a Master of Science in flight test engineering.  His first assignment as a test pilot was to Eglin Air Force Base, where he tested the F-15C Eagle and F-15E Strike Eagle, and deployed as a U-28 pilot.  In 2010, Hines received his Masters of Science in aerospace engineering at the University of Alabama. Hines joined the Air Force Reserves at NAS JRB Fort Worth in 2011, where he worked as a wing plans officer, as well as a F-15E program test pilot at the 84th Test and Evaluation Squadron at Eglin Air Force Base.  Throughout his career, he has flown 76 combat missions, and has over 3,500 hours of flight time in 41 aircraft.  His transfer back to the regular Air Force as a lieutenant colonel was approved by the U.S. Senate in February 2019.

NASA career
Prior to his selection as an astronaut, Hines served as a test pilot at NASA's Johnson Space Center, as well as for the Federal Aviation Administration.  In 2017, he was selected as a member of NASA Astronaut Group 22, and began his two-year training.  At the time of his selection, Hines was a research pilot for the Aircraft Operations Division of the Flight Operations Directorate at NASA.

In February 2021, Hines was assigned as pilot of SpaceX Crew-4, alongside NASA astronaut Kjell N. Lindgren who is the commander. They are flying with mission specialists Samantha Cristoforetti of ESA and Jessica Watkins. Crew-4 launched successfully on April 27, 2022, before docking later that day.

Personal life
Hines and his wife, Kelli, have three children.

Amateur radio

Hines holds a Technician class Ham Radio operators license with call sign KI5RQT.

Awards and honors
During his Air Force career, Hines received multiple awards, including the Air Medal, Aerial Achievement Medal, Iraq Campaign Medal, Afghanistan Campaign Medal, and the Nuclear Deterrence Operations Service Medal.  He received the U.S. Air Force Bobby Bond Memorial Aviator Award, and the NASA Stuart Present Flight Achievement Award.  He is a member of the Society of Experimental Test Pilots and the American Institute of Aeronautics and Astronautics.

References

External links

 Astronaut Doug Hines enters the Boeing Starliner for the first time during OFT-2

1975 births
American astronauts
American test pilots
Boston University College of Engineering alumni
Living people
People from Fayetteville, North Carolina
People from Harrisburg, Pennsylvania
Military personnel from North Carolina
Military personnel from Pennsylvania
SpaceX astronauts
United States Air Force officers
University of Alabama alumni
U.S. Air Force Test Pilot School alumni